The Roaring Road is a 1919 American silent action romance film produced by Famous Players-Lasky and distributed by Paramount Pictures. It is taken from the short stories by Byron Morgan; Junkpile Sweepstakes, Undertaker's Handicap, and Roaring Road.

This film was so successful that it spawned a sequel, Excuse My Dust, from stories by the same author. This film is available on video and DVD from online sources.

Plot
As described in a film magazine, "Toodles" Walden (Reid), an automobile salesman who works for a sporty old automobile distributor J. D. Ward (Roberts), has racing ambitions and is in love with Ward's daughter Dorothy (Little). The old man does not propose to give her up for five years and overreaches in an attempt to stimulate the young man with feigned complaints. They part company, but Ward is in despair when three racing machines are damaged in a train wreck.

Toodles buys the wreckage and assembles one complete car with the aid of his mechanic. With this car Toodles wins an important race, then holds up Ward for an increase in pay. There are just a few days left for a record to be broken between Los Angeles and San Francisco, and after Toodles is arrested for speeding, Ward has him released as part of his plot to break this record. Ward kidnaps his own daughter, and Toodles comes to the rescue and breaks the record, and also wins Dorothy.

Cast
Wallace Reid - Walter Thomas "Toodles" Waldron
Ann Little - Dorothy Ward, the cub
Theodore Roberts - J. D. Ward, the bear
Guy Oliver - Tom Darby
Clarence Geldart - Fred Wheeler
 
Larry Steers and Teddy Tetzlaff appear uncredited.

See also
The House That Shadows Built (1931 promotional film by Paramount)
 Wallace Reid filmography

References

External links

The Roaring Road; allmovie.com

1919 films
American silent feature films
American auto racing films
Films directed by James Cruze
Films based on short fiction
Famous Players-Lasky films
American black-and-white films
1910s action films
1910s romance films
American romantic action films
1910s American films